Pharao is the first album of German band Pharao, released on November 22, 1994.

Track listing
 There Is a Star 3:55
 King Pharao 3:28
 I Show You Secrets 4:02
 World Of Magic 4:10
 Dance Of The Snake 4:24
 Eternity 4:50
 Gold In The Pyramid 4:37
 Beautiful Flower Of The Bad 1:37
 We Got The Key 4:43
 It's Your Way 3:54
 Rave Like An Egyptian 6:27
 Christmasland 4:18
 I Show You Secrets (Unplugged Version) 3:49

Sales and certifications

References 

1994 albums
Pharao albums